Šuljam is a village located in the Sremska Mitrovica municipality, in the Syrmia District of Serbia. It is situated in the autonomous province of Vojvodina. The village has a Serb ethnic majority and its population numbering 744 people (2002 census).

Name
In Serbian, the village is known as Šuljam(Шуљам), in Croatian as Šuljam, and in Hungarian as Sulyom.

History 
It is believed that the first vines in the Eastern Roman Empire on Fruška Gora (ALMA MONS lat.) and above the Suljam on a hill called Glavica, was planted by the Roman emperor Marcus Aurelius Probus.

In 1579 Suljam is known as a village, but on maps it is shown for the first time in 1730. The Suljam was under the authority of Puppet state of NDH in World War II.

Historical population
1761. : 590
1793. : 513
1810. : 550
1961. : 952
1971. : 863
1981. : 777
1991. : 741
2002. : 744

People have said about Šuljam
1698. : "The village can earn up to 1000 forints per year."

1702. : "This place has around 44 houses. It is inhabited by Orthodox Rashani(Christians). They have a beautiful church, which, according to their testimony, was built by St. Episcop Maxim, whose body rests in the church of the Krušedol monastery. At the time of the Turks, cattle farmers did not pay for the use of common pastures, nor gave nineteenth products to the local community. They do not remember who was the last Christian landlord. The turkish landlord was Halil-beg from Mitrovica, to whom they paid each tenth of what they produced and Oka of butter per home. Sultan's tax in the amount of 3 forints per session of land(23ha) paid in Budim. 

1761. : "This is one of the oldest villages in Syrmia. An old church can still be seen in it, which is said to have been built by St. Episcop Maxim. Suljam residents are all Orthodox Christians. There are about 600 people, including 54 peasant families, various craftsmen and one Gypsy family. There is a shop in the village.

1774. : "Suljam has 69 houses"

Present 
It was theme in the TV series State Job in the 1026th episode.

References

Slobodan Ćurčić, Broj stanovnika Vojvodine, Novi Sad, 1996.
Marko Jačov, Srem na prelomu dva veka, Beograd 1990.
Fruškać 2018

Family names of the locals
Some of the prominent families in the village include:
Miloradić, Vidović, Manastirac, Janković, Đenić, Bošković, Kuzminac, Apić, Radosavljević, Stefanović, Đurić, Radić, Smiljanić, Grujić, Vidić, Nikolić, Janić, Dević, Subić, Ivković, Tomičić, Terzić, Lazić, Vasić, Milinković, Đurđević, Jurišić, Ostojić, Lukić, Ličinar, Andrić,  etc.

Populated places in Syrmia
Sremska Mitrovica